Bachalpsee or Bachsee is a lake with an area of  close to the First (which can be reached with a cable car) above Grindelwald in the Bernese Oberland, Switzerland.

The lake is featured in Gmail as part of its mountain theme background (as of 2013).

See also
List of mountain lakes of Switzerland

References 

Bachalp
Bernese Oberland
Lakes of the canton of Bern
LBachalpsee